"Lost in Emotion" is a song by urban contemporary band Lisa Lisa and Cult Jam that appeared on their 1987 album Spanish Fly. The song hit number one on the Billboard Hot 100 on October 17, 1987. The song was their second number-one single (having scored this first earlier in the year with "Head to Toe"). The song also went to number one on the Black Singles chart, and number eight on the dance chart.

Full Force member Lou George describes "Lost in Emotion" as "a combination" of two Mary Wells' hits: "Two Lovers" and "You Beat Me to the Punch", an idea which occurred to George as the result of his playing Wells' Greatest Hits album on which "Two Lovers" and "You Beat Me to the Punch" were sequential tracks. George - "We didn't steal the riffs: all we did was get the flavoring...We [used] a xylophone and some bells because back in the Motown days they always used those simple instruments."

Video
The video for the song was filmed at the 116th Street Festival in Harlem. With the exception of the group dance routine, the video has an unstructured, almost unrehearsed feel. This was done intentionally for the carnival setting. In a 2020 interview with NJArts.net, Lisa Lisa recalled telling the director, “Look, just have the camera follow us and we’re going to have fun with this.”

Charts

Weekly charts

Year-end charts

References

1987 singles
Billboard Hot 100 number-one singles
Cashbox number-one singles
Lisa Lisa and Cult Jam songs
Song recordings produced by Full Force